Na-Me United Football Club (Thai นาเม่ ยูไนเต็ด), is a Thai football club based in Bangkok, Thailand. The club is currently playing in the Thai Football Division 3.

Record

References

External links
 

Association football clubs established in 2015
Football clubs in Bangkok
Sport in Bangkok
2015 establishments in Thailand